Motown is the sixth studio album by American singer-songwriter Michael McDonald. The album was released on June 24, 2003, by Universal Music International and Motown.

Track listing

Personnel 

 Michael McDonald – lead and backing vocals, acoustic piano, Fender Rhodes, arrangements
 Toby Baker – keyboards, synthesizers, programming, acoustic guitar, electric guitar, bass, drum programming, arrangements, backing vocals 
 Tony Swain – keyboards, synthesizers, Fender Rhodes
 Bob James – keyboards
 Tim Akers – Hammond organ 
 Tim Carmon – Hammond organ
 Simon Climie – arrangements, ProTools programming, acoustic guitar, electric guitar, backing vocals 
 Chris Rodriguez – electric guitar, electric sitar
 Michael Thompson – guitar 
 Larry Carlton – guitar
 Nathan East – bass 
 Nicky Shaw – drums, percussion drum programming, arrangements
 Ricky Lawson – drums
 Harvey Mason – drums, percussion 
 Paul Waller – percussion, programming, sound effects
 Mark Douthit – saxophone 
 Nick Ingman – string arrangements
 Cliff Masterson – string arrangements
 Gavyn Wright – orchestra leader 
 Isobel Griffiths – orchestra contractor
 The London Session Orchestra – strings
 Tracy Ackerman – backing vocals 
 Amy Holland – backing vocals 
 Jennifer Karr – backing vocals 
 Audrey Martells – backing vocals 
 Gale Mayes-West – backing vocals 
 Alfreda McCrary Lee – backing vocals 
 Ann McCrary – backing vocals 
 Tommy Sims – backing vocals 
 Dwayne Starling – backing vocals 
 Tammy Taylor – backing vocals 
 Leon Ware – backing vocals 
 Kevin Whalum – backing vocals

Production 
 Producer – Simon Climie
 Executive Producer – Tony Swain
 Production Coordination – Lisa Patton and Debbie Johnson
 Engineers – Ben Fowler and Don Murray
 Second Engineer – Grady Walker
 Additional Engineer – Shannon Forrest
 Assistant Engineers – Joel Everden and Tom Sweeney
 ProTools Engineering – Adam Brown, Simon Climie, Shannon Forrest and Jonathan Shakovskoy.
 ProTools Assistant – Joel Everden 
 Orchestra recorded by Alan Douglas 
 Mixed by Mick Guzauski at Banking Doctor Recording (Mount Kisco, NY), assisted by Tom Bender.
 Mastered by Bob Ludwig at Gateway Mastering (Portland, ME).
 Album Coordinator – Dee Harrington
 Cover Photo – Michael Wilson
 Wardrobe – Richard Orga
 Styling and Makeup – Cindy Rich

Charts

Weekly charts

Year-end charts

References

2003 albums
Michael McDonald (musician) albums
Motown cover albums